Arhopala alitaeus or purple broken-band oakblue, is a butterfly of the family Lycaenidae. It is found in Asia (see subspecies section).

Subspecies
A. a. alitaeus (Sulawesi, Banggai)
A. a. mirabella (Burma, Mergui, Thailand, Langkawi)
A. a. pardenas (Peninsular Malaya, Singapore)
A. a. myrtale (Palawan)
A. a. mindanensis Philippines (Mindanao)
A. a. zilensis (Basilan)
A. a. shigeae (Philippines)

Arhopala
Butterflies of Asia
Butterflies described in 1862
Taxa named by William Chapman Hewitson